Sütçüler is a town and district of Isparta Province in the Mediterranean region of Turkey. The population is 2,224 as of 2010.

See also
 Yazılı Canyon Nature Park

References

External links
 District governor's official website 
 District municipality's official website 

Populated places in Isparta Province
 
Pisidia
Towns in Turkey